Hopewell is a neighborhood in Nashville, Davidson County, Tennessee, United States. It lies at an elevation of 472 feet (144 m).

The role of Hopewell and the manipulation of the votes of its predominantly African-American population for the purposes of early 20th century machine politics in Tennessee is described in The Secrets of the Hopewell Box by James D. Squires (Vanderbilt University Press, .)

References

Neighborhoods in Nashville, Tennessee